Gabriela Palacio Díaz de León (born March 28, 1989) is a Mexican singer, model and beauty pageant titleholder who obtained the 2010 Nuestra Belleza Internacional México title.

A marketing student from Aguascalientes, Aguascalientes, Gabriela Palacio was designated to participate in the 2010 Nuestra Belleza México contest, held September 25, 2010 in Saltillo, Coahuila. The 21-year-old was crowned Nuestra Belleza Internacional México by Anagabriela Espinoza, the outgoing national titleholder and reigning Miss International 2009. She is the first delegate from her state to obtain a national title from the Nuestra Belleza México organization. Palacio competed in the 50th Miss International pageant, held on November 7, 2010, in Chengdu, China where she won the Miss Photogenic award. She previously won the 2009 Reina Nacional de la Feria de San Marcos contest. On August 3, 2011, it was announced by the Nuestra Belleza Mexico organization that Palacio would represent her country in the 61st Miss World pageant, held on November 6, 2011, after Cynthia de la Vega was dethroned.

References

(Dethorend)

1989 births
Miss International 2010 delegates
Miss World 2011 delegates
Nuestra Belleza México winners
People from Aguascalientes
Living people